Pettry is an unincorporated community in Mercer County, in the U.S. state of West Virginia.

History
A post office called Pettry was established in 1907, and remained in operation until 1952. C. W. Pettrey, an early postmaster, gave the community his name.

References

Unincorporated communities in Mercer County, West Virginia
Unincorporated communities in West Virginia